A village is an incorporated urban municipality in the Canadian province of Manitoba. Under the province's Municipal Act of 1997, a community must have a minimum population of 1,000 and a minimum density of 400 people per square kilometre to incorporate as an urban municipality. As an urban municipality, the community has the option to be named a village, town or urban municipality. It also has the option of being named a city once it has a minimum population of 7,500.

Manitoba has two villages that have a cumulative population of 1,933 in the Canada 2016 census. There were several communities with village status prior to January 1, 2015, when most were eliminated through municipal amalgamations. St-Pierre-Jolys, which has a population of 1,170, is the only village surpassing the Municipal Act's 1,000-person threshold. Dunnottar, which has a population of 763, has been granted an exemption from the minimum population requirement.

List

Former villages
A list of formerly incorporated villages, excluding current and former towns and cities that previously held village status.

See also 
List of communities in Manitoba
List of ghost towns in Manitoba
List of municipalities in Manitoba
List of cities in Manitoba
List of rural municipalities in Manitoba
List of local urban districts in Manitoba
List of towns in Manitoba
Manitoba municipal amalgamations, 2015

References 

Villages